SERVIS-1, or Space Environment Reliability Verification Integrated System 1, is a Japanese satellite designed for testing the performance of commercial off-the-shelf products in the space environment. It has a mass of about 840 kg, and was launched on 30 October 2003 from the Plesetsk Cosmodrome by Eurockot, who used a Rokot rocket with a Briz-KM upper stage. The satellite was active for two years. A second satellite, SERVIS-2, was launched in 2010.

Experiments
Nine experiments were being conducted by SERVIS-1.

Results from the mission 
All the modules on the satellite worked as planned. The mission tested a number of electronic components, and determined that the rate of single-event upsets at its 1000 km orbit was substantially less than had been expected from tests using heavy ion bombardment on the ground.

See also

2003 in spaceflight

References 

Satellites of Japan
Spacecraft launched in 2003